Anthony or Tony Lawrence may refer to:

 Anthony Lawrence (basketball) (born 1996), American basketball player
 Anthony Lawrence (cricketer) (1911–1939), English cricketer
 Anthony Lawrence (journalist) (1912–2013), British journalist
 Anthony Lawrence (judge) (born 1965), American judge on the Mississippi Court of Appeals
 Anthony Lawrence (poet) (born 1957), Australian poet and novelist
 Tony Lawrence (soccer) (born 1946), Canadian soccer player
 Tony Lawrence (singer), Harlem singer of the 1960s
 Tony Lawrence, actor who appeared in Ghost Squad (1961), Mister Rogers' Neighborhood (1968)
 Tony Lawrence, a character in The Young Philadelphians played by actor Paul Newman